Asma Qureshi Farzand (born 1 January 1981) is a Pakistani former cricketer who played as a wicket-keeper and right-handed batter. She appeared in one Test match and eight One Day Internationals for Pakistan in 1997 and 1998.

References

External links
 
 

1981 births
Living people
Cricketers from Lahore
Pakistan women Test cricketers
Pakistan women One Day International cricketers